Ionizing radiation (or ionising radiation), including nuclear radiation, consists of subatomic particles or electromagnetic waves that have sufficient energy to ionize atoms or molecules by detaching electrons from them. Some particles can travel up to 99% of the speed of light, and the electromagnetic waves are on the high-energy portion of the electromagnetic spectrum.

Gamma rays, X-rays, and the higher energy ultraviolet part of the electromagnetic spectrum are ionizing radiation, whereas the lower energy ultraviolet, visible light, nearly all types of laser light, infrared, microwaves, and radio waves are non-ionizing radiation. The boundary between ionizing and non-ionizing radiation in the ultraviolet area is not sharply defined, as different molecules and atoms ionize at different energies. The energy of ionizing radiation starts between 10 electronvolts (eV) and 33 eV.

Typical ionizing subatomic particles include alpha particles, beta particles, and neutrons. These are typically created by radioactive decay, and almost all are energetic enough to ionize. There are also secondary cosmic particles produced after cosmic rays interact with Earth's atmosphere, including muons, mesons, and positrons. Cosmic rays may also produce radioisotopes on Earth (for example, carbon-14), which in turn decay and emit ionizing radiation. Cosmic rays and the decay of radioactive isotopes are the primary sources of natural ionizing radiation on Earth, contributing to background radiation. Ionizing radiation is also generated artificially by X-ray tubes, particle accelerators, and nuclear fission.

Ionizing radiation is not immediately detectable by human senses, so instruments such as Geiger counters are used to detect and measure it. However, very high energy particles can produce visible effects on both organic and inorganic matter (e.g. water lighting in Cherenkov radiation) or humans (e.g. acute radiation syndrome).

Ionizing radiation is used in a wide variety of fields such as medicine, nuclear power, research, and industrial manufacturing, but presents a health hazard if proper measures against excessive exposure are not taken. Exposure to ionizing radiation causes cell damage to living tissue and organ damage. In high acute doses, it will result in radiation burns and radiation sickness, and lower level doses over a protracted time can cause cancer. The International Commission on Radiological Protection (ICRP) issues guidance on ionizing radiation protection, and the effects of dose uptake on human health.

Directly ionizing radiation

Ionizing radiation may be grouped as directly or indirectly ionizing.

Any charged particle with mass can ionize atoms directly by fundamental interaction through the Coulomb force if it carries sufficient kinetic energy. Such particles include atomic nuclei, electrons, muons, charged pions, protons, and energetic charged nuclei stripped of their electrons. When moving at relativistic speeds (near the speed of light, c) these particles have enough kinetic energy to be ionizing, but there is considerable speed variation. For example, a typical alpha particle moves at about 5% of c, but an electron with 33 eV (just enough to ionize) moves at about 1% of c.

Two of the first types of directly ionizing radiation to be discovered are alpha particles which are helium nuclei ejected from the nucleus of an atom during radioactive decay, and energetic electrons, which are called beta particles.

Natural cosmic rays are made up primarily of relativistic protons but also include heavier atomic nuclei like helium ions and HZE ions. In the atmosphere such particles are often stopped by air molecules, and this produces short-lived charged pions, which soon decay to muons, a primary type of cosmic ray radiation that reaches the surface of the earth. Pions can also be produced in large amounts in particle accelerators.

Alpha particles

Alpha particles consist of two protons and two neutrons bound together into a particle identical to a helium nucleus. Alpha particle emissions are generally produced in the process of alpha decay.

Alpha particles are a strongly ionizing form of radiation, but when emitted by radioactive decay they have low penetration power and can be absorbed by a few centimeters of air, or by the top layer of human skin. More powerful alpha particles from ternary fission are three times as energetic, and penetrate proportionately farther in air. The helium nuclei that form 10–12% of cosmic rays, are also usually of much higher energy than those produced by radioactive decay and pose shielding problems in space. However, this type of radiation is significantly absorbed by the Earth's atmosphere, which is a radiation shield equivalent to about 10 meters of water.

The alpha particle was named by Ernest Rutherford after the first letter in the Greek alphabet, α, when he ranked the known radioactive emissions in descending order of ionising effect in 1899. The symbol is α or α2+. If the ion gains electrons from its environment, the alpha particle can be written as a normal (electrically neutral) helium atom .

Beta particles

Beta particles are high-energy, high-speed electrons or positrons emitted by certain types of radioactive nuclei, such as potassium-40. The production of beta particles is termed beta decay. They are designated by the Greek letter beta (β). There are two forms of beta decay, β− and β+, which respectively give rise to the electron and the positron. Beta particles are less penetrating than gamma radiation, but more penetrating than alpha particles.

High-energy beta particles may produce X-rays known as bremsstrahlung ("braking radiation") or secondary electrons (delta ray) as they pass through matter. Both of these can cause an indirect ionization effect. Bremsstrahlung is of concern when shielding beta emitters, as the interaction of beta particles with some shielding materials produces Bremsstrahlung. The effect is greater with material having high atomic numbers, so material with low atomic numbers is used for beta source shielding.

Positrons and other types of antimatter

The positron or antielectron is the antiparticle or the antimatter counterpart of the electron. When a low-energy positron collides with a low-energy electron, annihilation occurs, resulting in their conversion into the energy of two or more gamma ray photons (see electron–positron annihilation). As positrons are positively charged particles they can directly ionize an atom through Coulomb interactions.

Positrons can be generated by positron emission nuclear decay (through weak interactions), or by pair production from a sufficiently energetic photon. Positrons are common artificial sources of ionizing radiation used in medical positron emission tomography (PET) scans.

Charged nuclei
Charged nuclei are characteristic of galactic cosmic rays and solar particle events and except for alpha particles (charged helium nuclei) have no natural sources on the earth. In space, however, very high energy protons, helium nuclei, and HZE ions can be initially stopped by relatively thin layers of shielding, clothes, or skin. However, the resulting interaction will generate secondary radiation and cause cascading biological effects. If just one atom of tissue is displaced by an energetic proton, for example, the collision will cause further interactions in the body. This is called "linear energy transfer" (LET), which utilizes elastic scattering.

LET can be visualized as a billiard ball hitting another in the manner of the conservation of momentum, sending both away with the energy of the first ball divided between the two unequally. When a charged nucleus strikes a relatively slow-moving nucleus of an object in space, LET occurs and neutrons, alpha particles, low-energy protons, and other nuclei will be released by the collisions and contribute to the total absorbed dose of tissue.

Indirectly ionizing radiation
Indirectly ionizing radiation is electrically neutral and does not interact strongly with matter, therefore the bulk of the ionization effects are due to secondary ionization.

Photon radiation

Even though photons are electrically neutral, they can ionize atoms indirectly through the photoelectric effect and the Compton effect. Either of those interactions will cause the ejection of an electron from an atom at relativistic speeds, turning that electron into a beta particle (secondary beta particle) that will ionize other atoms. Since most of the ionized atoms are due to the secondary beta particles, photons are indirectly ionizing radiation.

Radiated photons are called gamma rays if they are produced by a nuclear reaction, subatomic particle decay, or radioactive decay within the nucleus. They are called x-rays if produced outside the nucleus. The generic term "photon" is used to describe both.

X-rays normally have a lower energy than gamma rays, and an older convention was to define the boundary as a wavelength of 10−11 m (or a photon energy of 100 keV). That threshold was driven by historic limitations of older X-ray tubes and low awareness of isomeric transitions. Modern technologies and discoveries have shown an overlap between X-ray and gamma energies. In many fields they are functionally identical, differing for terrestrial studies only in origin of the radiation. In astronomy, however, where radiation origin often cannot be reliably determined, the old energy division has been preserved, with X-rays defined as being between about 120 eV and 120 keV, and gamma rays as being of any energy above 100 to 120 keV, regardless of source. Most astronomical "gamma-ray astronomy" are known not to originate in nuclear radioactive processes but, rather, result from processes like those that produce astronomical X-rays, except driven by much more energetic electrons.

Photoelectric absorption is the dominant mechanism in organic materials for photon energies below 100 keV, typical of classical X-ray tube originated X-rays. At energies beyond 100 keV, photons ionize matter increasingly through the Compton effect, and then indirectly through pair production at energies beyond 5 MeV. The accompanying interaction diagram shows two Compton scatterings happening sequentially. In every scattering event, the gamma ray transfers energy to an electron, and it continues on its path in a different direction and with reduced energy.

Definition boundary for lower-energy photons

The lowest ionization energy of any element is 3.89 eV, for caesium. However, US Federal Communications Commission material defines ionizing radiation as that with a photon energy greater than 10 eV (equivalent to a far ultraviolet wavelength of 124 nanometers). Roughly, this corresponds to both the first ionization energy of oxygen, and the ionization energy of hydrogen, both about 14 eV. In some Environmental Protection Agency references, the ionization of a typical water molecule at an energy of 33 eV is referenced as the appropriate biological threshold for ionizing radiation: this value represents the so-called W-value, the colloquial name for the ICRU's mean energy expended in a gas per ion pair formed, which combines ionization energy plus the energy lost to other processes such as excitation. At 38 nanometers wavelength for electromagnetic radiation, 33 eV is close to the energy at the conventional 10 nm wavelength transition between extreme ultraviolet and X-ray radiation, which occurs at about 125 eV. Thus, X-ray radiation is always ionizing, but only extreme-ultraviolet radiation can be considered ionizing under all definitions.

Neutrons

Neutrons have a neutral electrical charge often misunderstood as zero electrical charge and thus often do not directly cause ionization in a single step or interaction with matter. However, fast neutrons will interact with the protons in hydrogen via linear energy transfer, energy that a particle transfers to the material it is moving through. This mechanism scatters the nuclei of the materials in the target area, causing direct ionization of the hydrogen atoms. When neutrons strike the hydrogen nuclei, proton radiation (fast protons) results. These protons are themselves ionizing because they are of high energy, are charged, and interact with the electrons in matter.

Neutrons that strike other nuclei besides hydrogen will transfer less energy to the other particle if linear energy transfer does occur. But, for many nuclei struck by neutrons, inelastic scattering occurs. Whether elastic or inelastic scatter occurs is dependent on the speed of the neutron, whether fast or thermal or somewhere in between. It is also dependent on the nuclei it strikes and its neutron cross section.

In inelastic scattering, neutrons are readily absorbed in a type of nuclear reaction called neutron capture and attributes to the neutron activation of the nucleus. Neutron interactions with most types of matter in this manner usually produce radioactive nuclei. The abundant oxygen-16 nucleus, for example, undergoes neutron activation, rapidly decays by a proton emission forming nitrogen-16, which decays to oxygen-16. The short-lived nitrogen-16 decay emits a powerful beta ray. This process can be written as:

16O (n,p) 16N (fast neutron capture possible with >11 MeV neutron)
16N → 16O + β− (Decay t1/2 = 7.13 s)
This high-energy β− further interacts rapidly with other nuclei, emitting high-energy γ via Bremsstrahlung

While not a favorable reaction, the 16O (n,p) 16N reaction is a major source of X-rays emitted from the cooling water of a pressurized water reactor and contributes enormously to the radiation generated by a water-cooled nuclear reactor while operating.

For the best shielding of neutrons, hydrocarbons that have an abundance of hydrogen are used.

In fissile materials, secondary neutrons may produce nuclear chain reactions, causing a larger amount of ionization from the daughter products of fission.

Outside the nucleus, free neutrons are unstable and have a mean lifetime of 14 minutes, 42 seconds. Free neutrons decay by emission of an electron and an electron antineutrino to become a proton, a process known as beta decay:

In the adjacent diagram, a neutron collides with a proton of the target material, and then becomes a fast recoil proton that ionizes in turn. At the end of its path, the neutron is captured by a nucleus in an (n,γ)-reaction that leads to the emission of a neutron capture photon. Such photons always have enough energy to qualify as ionizing radiation.

Physical effects

Nuclear effects
Neutron radiation, alpha radiation, and extremely energetic gamma (> ~20 MeV) can cause nuclear transmutation and induced radioactivity. The relevant mechanisms are neutron activation, alpha absorption, and photodisintegration. A large enough number of transmutations can change macroscopic properties and cause targets to become radioactive themselves, even after the original source is removed.

Chemical effects

Ionization of molecules can lead to radiolysis (breaking chemical bonds), and formation of highly reactive free radicals. These free radicals may then react chemically with neighbouring materials even after the original radiation has stopped. (e.g., ozone cracking of polymers by ozone formed by ionization of air). Ionizing radiation can also accelerate existing chemical reactions such as polymerization and corrosion, by contributing to the activation energy required for the reaction. Optical materials deteriorate under the effect of ionizing radiation.

High-intensity ionizing radiation in air can produce a visible ionized air glow of telltale bluish-purple color. The glow can be observed, e.g., during criticality accidents, around mushroom clouds shortly after a nuclear explosion, or the inside of a damaged nuclear reactor like during the Chernobyl disaster.

Monatomic fluids, e.g. molten sodium, have no chemical bonds to break and no crystal lattice to disturb, so they are immune to the chemical effects of ionizing radiation. Simple diatomic compounds with very negative enthalpy of formation, such as hydrogen fluoride will reform rapidly and spontaneously after ionization.

Electrical effects
Ionization of materials temporarily increases their conductivity, potentially permitting damaging current levels. This is a particular hazard in semiconductor microelectronics employed in electronic equipment, with subsequent currents introducing operation errors or even permanently damaging the devices. Devices intended for high radiation environments such as the nuclear industry and extra-atmospheric (space) applications may be made radiation hard to resist such effects through design, material selection, and fabrication methods.

Proton radiation found in space can also cause single-event upsets in digital circuits. The electrical effects of ionizing radiation are exploited in gas-filled radiation detectors, e.g. the Geiger-Muller counter or the ion chamber.

Health effects

Most adverse health effects of exposure to ionizing radiation may be grouped in two general categories:
 deterministic effects (harmful tissue reactions) due in large part to killing or malfunction of cells following high doses from radiation burns.
 stochastic effects, i.e., cancer and heritable effects involving either cancer development in exposed individuals owing to mutation of somatic cells or heritable disease in their offspring owing to mutation of reproductive (germ) cells.

The most common impact is stochastic induction of cancer with a latent period of years or decades after exposure. For example, ionizing radiation is one cause of chronic myelogenous leukemia, although most people with CML have not been exposed to radiation. The mechanism by which this occurs is well understood, but quantitative models predicting the level of risk remain controversial.

The most widely accepted model, the Linear no-threshold model (LNT),  holds that the incidence of cancers due to ionizing radiation increases linearly with effective radiation dose at a rate of 5.5% per sievert. If this is correct, then natural background radiation is the most hazardous source of radiation to general public health, followed by medical imaging as a close second. Other stochastic effects of ionizing radiation are teratogenesis, cognitive decline, and heart disease.

Although DNA is always susceptible to damage by ionizing radiation, the DNA molecule may also be damaged by radiation with enough energy to excite certain molecular bonds to form pyrimidine dimers. This energy may be less than ionizing, but near to it. A good example is ultraviolet spectrum energy which begins at about 3.1 eV (400 nm) at close to the same energy level which can cause sunburn to unprotected skin, as a result of photoreactions in collagen and (in the UV-B range) also damage in DNA (for example, pyrimidine dimers). Thus, the mid and lower ultraviolet electromagnetic spectrum is damaging to biological tissues as a result of electronic excitation in molecules which falls short of ionization, but produces similar non-thermal effects. To some extent, visible light and also ultraviolet A (UVA) which is closest to visible energies, have been proven to result in formation of reactive oxygen species in skin, which cause indirect damage since these are electronically excited molecules which can inflict reactive damage, although they do not cause sunburn (erythema). Like ionization-damage, all these effects in skin are beyond those produced by simple thermal effects.

Measurement of radiation

The table below shows radiation and dose quantities in SI and non-SI units.

Uses of radiation

Ionizing radiation has many industrial, military, and medical uses. Its usefulness must be balanced with its hazards, a compromise that has shifted over time. For example, at one time, assistants in shoe shops used X-rays to check a child's shoe size, but this practice was halted when the risks of ionizing radiation were better understood.

Neutron radiation is essential to the working of nuclear reactors and nuclear weapons. The penetrating power of x-ray, gamma, beta, and positron radiation is used for medical imaging, nondestructive testing, and a variety of industrial gauges. Radioactive tracers are used in medical and industrial applications, as well as biological and radiation chemistry. Alpha radiation is used in static eliminators and smoke detectors. The sterilizing effects of ionizing radiation are useful for cleaning medical instruments, food irradiation, and the sterile insect technique. Measurements of carbon-14, can be used to date the remains of long-dead organisms (such as wood that is thousands of years old).

Sources of radiation
Ionizing radiation is generated through nuclear reactions, nuclear decay, by very high temperature, or via acceleration of charged particles in electromagnetic fields. Natural sources include the sun, lightning and supernova explosions. Artificial sources include nuclear reactors, particle accelerators, and x-ray tubes.

The United Nations Scientific Committee on the Effects of Atomic Radiation (UNSCEAR) itemized types of human exposures.

The International Commission on Radiological Protection manages the International System of Radiological Protection, which sets recommended limits for dose uptake.

Background radiation

Background radiation comes from both natural and man-made sources.

The global average exposure of humans to ionizing radiation is about 3 mSv (0.3 rem) per year, 80% of which comes from nature. The remaining 20% results from exposure to man-made radiation sources, primarily from medical imaging. Average man-made exposure is much higher in developed countries, mostly due to CT scans and nuclear medicine.

Natural background radiation comes from five primary sources: cosmic radiation, solar radiation, external terrestrial sources, radiation in the human body, and radon.

The background rate for natural radiation varies considerably with location, being as low as 1.5 mSv/a (1.5 mSv per year) in some areas and over 100 mSv/a in others. The highest level of purely natural radiation recorded on the Earth's surface is 90 µGy/h (0.8 Gy/a) on a Brazilian black beach composed of monazite. The highest background radiation in an inhabited area is found in Ramsar, primarily due to naturally radioactive limestone used as a building material. Some 2000 of the most exposed residents receive an average radiation dose of 10 mGy per year, (1 rad/yr) ten times more than the ICRP recommended limit for exposure to the public from artificial sources. Record levels were found in a house where the effective radiation dose due to external radiation was 135 mSv/a, (13.5 rem/yr) and the committed dose from radon was 640 mSv/a (64.0 rem/yr). This unique case is over 200 times higher than the world average background radiation. Despite the high levels of background radiation that the residents of Ramsar receive there is no compelling evidence that they experience a greater health risk. The ICRP recommendations are conservative limits and may represent an over representation of the actual health risk. Generally radiation safety organization recommend the most conservative limits assuming it is best to err on the side of caution. This level of caution is appropriate but should not be used to create fear about background radiation danger. Radiation danger from background radiation may be a serious threat but is more likely a small overall risk compared to all other factors in the environment.

Cosmic radiation

The Earth, and all living things on it, are constantly bombarded by radiation from outside our solar system. This cosmic radiation consists of relativistic particles: positively charged nuclei (ions) from 1 amu protons (about 85% of it) to 26 amu iron nuclei and even beyond. (The high-atomic number particles are called HZE ions.) The energy of this radiation can far exceed that which humans can create, even in the largest particle accelerators (see ultra-high-energy cosmic ray). This radiation interacts in the atmosphere to create secondary radiation that rains down, including x-rays, muons, protons, antiprotons, alpha particles, pions, electrons, positrons, and neutrons.

The dose from cosmic radiation is largely from muons, neutrons, and electrons, with a dose rate that varies in different parts of the world and based largely on the geomagnetic field, altitude, and solar cycle. The cosmic-radiation dose rate on airplanes is so high that, according to the United Nations UNSCEAR 2000 Report (see links at bottom), airline flight crew workers receive more dose on average than any other worker, including those in nuclear power plants. Airline crews receive more cosmic rays if they routinely work flight routes that take them close to the North or South pole at high altitudes, where this type of radiation is maximal.

Cosmic rays also include high-energy gamma rays, which are far beyond the energies produced by solar or human sources.

External terrestrial sources
Most materials on Earth contain some radioactive atoms, even if in small quantities. Most of the dose received from these sources is from gamma-ray emitters in building materials, or rocks and soil when outside. The major radionuclides of concern for terrestrial radiation are isotopes of potassium, uranium, and thorium. Each of these sources has been decreasing in activity since the formation of the Earth.

Internal radiation sources

All earthly materials that are the building blocks of life contain a radioactive component. As humans, plants, and animals consume food, air, and water, an inventory of radioisotopes builds up within the organism (see banana equivalent dose). Some radionuclides, like potassium-40, emit a high-energy gamma ray that can be measured by sensitive electronic radiation measurement systems. These internal radiation sources contribute to an individual's total radiation dose from natural background radiation.

Radon

An important source of natural radiation is radon gas, which seeps continuously from bedrock but can, because of its high density, accumulate in poorly ventilated houses.

Radon-222 is a gas produced by the α-decay of radium-226. Both are a part of the natural uranium decay chain. Uranium is found in soil throughout the world in varying concentrations. Radon is the largest cause of lung cancer among non-smokers and the second-leading cause overall.

Radiation exposure

There are three standard ways to limit exposure:
 Time: For people exposed to radiation in addition to natural background radiation, limiting or minimizing the exposure time will reduce the dose from the radiation source.
 Distance: Radiation intensity decreases sharply with distance, according to an inverse-square law (in an absolute vacuum).
 Shielding: Air or skin can be sufficient to substantially attenuate alpha and beta radiation. Barriers of lead, concrete, or water are often used to give effective protection from more penetrating particles such as gamma rays and neutrons. Some radioactive materials are stored or handled underwater or by remote control in rooms constructed of thick concrete or lined with lead. There are special plastic shields that stop beta particles, and air will stop most alpha particles. The effectiveness of a material in shielding radiation is determined by its half-value thicknesses, the thickness of material that reduces the radiation by half. This value is a function of the material itself and of the type and energy of ionizing radiation. Some generally accepted thicknesses of attenuating material are 5 mm of aluminum for most beta particles, and 3 inches of lead for gamma radiation.

These can all be applied to natural and man-made sources. For man-made sources the use of Containment is a major tool in reducing dose uptake and is effectively a combination of shielding and isolation from the open environment. Radioactive materials are confined in the smallest possible space and kept out of the environment such as in a hot cell (for radiation) or glove box (for contamination). Radioactive isotopes for medical use, for example, are dispensed in closed handling facilities, usually gloveboxes, while nuclear reactors operate within closed systems with multiple barriers that keep the radioactive materials contained. Work rooms, hot cells and gloveboxes have slightly reduced air pressures to prevent escape of airborne material to the open environment.

In nuclear conflicts or civil nuclear releases civil defense measures can help reduce exposure of populations by reducing ingestion of isotopes and occupational exposure. One is the issue of potassium iodide (KI) tablets, which blocks the uptake of radioactive iodine (one of the major radioisotope products of nuclear fission) into the human thyroid gland.

Occupational exposure
Occupationally exposed individuals are controlled within the regulatory framework of the country they work in, and in accordance with any local nuclear licence constraints. These are usually based on the recommendations of the International Commission on Radiological Protection.
The ICRP recommends limiting artificial irradiation. For occupational exposure, the limit is 50 mSv in a single year with a maximum of 100 mSv in a consecutive five-year period.

The radiation exposure of these individuals is carefully monitored with the use of dosimeters and other radiological protection instruments which will measure radioactive particulate concentrations, area gamma dose readings and radioactive contamination. A legal record of dose is kept.

Examples of activities where occupational exposure is a concern include:
 Airline crew (the most exposed population)
 Industrial radiography
 Medical radiology and nuclear medicine
 Uranium mining
 Nuclear power plant and nuclear fuel reprocessing plant workers
 Research laboratories (government, university and private)

Some human-made radiation sources affect the body through direct radiation, known as effective dose (radiation) while others take the form of radioactive contamination and irradiate the body from within. The latter is known as committed dose.

Public exposure
Medical procedures, such as diagnostic X-rays, nuclear medicine, and radiation therapy are by far the most significant source of human-made radiation exposure to the general public. Some of the major radionuclides used are I-131, Tc-99m, Co-60, Ir-192, and Cs-137. The public is also exposed to radiation from consumer products, such as tobacco (polonium-210), combustible fuels (gas, coal, etc.), televisions, luminous watches and dials (tritium), airport X-ray systems, smoke detectors (americium), electron tubes, and gas lantern mantles (thorium).

Of lesser magnitude, members of the public are exposed to radiation from the nuclear fuel cycle, which includes the entire sequence from processing uranium to the disposal of the spent fuel. The effects of such exposure have not been reliably measured due to the extremely low doses involved. Opponents use a cancer per dose model to assert that such activities cause several hundred cases of cancer per year, an application of the widely accepted Linear no-threshold model (LNT).

The International Commission on Radiological Protection recommends limiting artificial irradiation to the public to an average of 1 mSv (0.001 Sv) of effective dose per year, not including medical and occupational exposures.

In a nuclear war, gamma rays from both the initial weapon explosion and fallout would be the sources of radiation exposure.

Spaceflight
Massive particles are a concern for astronauts outside the earth's magnetic field who would receive solar particles from solar proton events (SPE) and galactic cosmic rays from cosmic sources. These high-energy charged nuclei are blocked by Earth's magnetic field but pose a major health concern for astronauts traveling to the moon and to any distant location beyond the earth orbit. Highly charged HZE ions in particular are known to be extremely damaging, although protons make up the vast majority of galactic cosmic rays. Evidence indicates past SPE radiation levels that would have been lethal for unprotected astronauts.

Air travel
Air travel exposes people on aircraft to increased radiation from space as compared to sea level, including cosmic rays and from solar flare events. Software programs such as Epcard, CARI, SIEVERT, PCAIRE are attempts to simulate exposure by aircrews and passengers. An example of a measured dose (not simulated dose) is 6 μSv per hour from London Heathrow to Tokyo Narita on a high-latitude polar route. However, dosages can vary, such as during periods of high solar activity. The United States FAA requires airlines to provide flight crew with information about cosmic radiation, and an International Commission on Radiological Protection recommendation for the general public is no more than 1 mSv per year. In addition, many airlines do not allow pregnant flightcrew members, to comply with a European Directive. The FAA has a recommended limit of 1 mSv total for a pregnancy, and no more than 0.5 mSv per month. Information originally based on Fundamentals of Aerospace Medicine published in 2008.

Radiation hazard warning signs
Hazardous levels of ionizing radiation are signified by the trefoil sign on a yellow background. These are usually posted at the boundary of a radiation controlled area or in any place where radiation levels are significantly above background due to human intervention.

The red ionizing radiation warning symbol (ISO 21482) was launched in 2007, and is intended for IAEA Category 1, 2 and 3 sources defined as dangerous sources capable of death or serious injury, including food irradiators, teletherapy machines for cancer treatment and industrial radiography units. The symbol is to be placed on the device housing the source, as a warning not to dismantle the device or to get any closer. It will not be visible under normal use, only if someone attempts to disassemble the device. The symbol will not be located on building access doors, transportation packages or containers.

See also

 European Committee on Radiation Risk
 International Commission on Radiological Protection – manages the International System of Radiological Protection
 Ionometer
 Irradiated mail
 National Council on Radiation Protection and Measurements – US national organisation
 Nuclear safety
 Nuclear semiotics
 Radiant energy
 Exposure (radiation)
 Radiation hormesis
 Radiation physics
 Radiation protection
 Radiation Protection Convention, 1960
 Radiation protection of patients
 Sievert
 Treatment of infections after accidental or hostile exposure to ionizing radiation

References

Literature

External links
 The Nuclear Regulatory Commission regulates most commercial radiation sources and non-medical exposures in the US:
 NLM Hazardous Substances Databank – Ionizing Radiation
 United Nations Scientific Committee on the Effects of Atomic Radiation 2000 Report Volume 1: Sources, Volume 2: Effects
 Beginners Guide to Ionising Radiation Measurement
  (from CT scans and xrays).
 Free Radiation Safety Course
 Health Physics Society Public Education Website
 Oak Ridge Reservation Basic Radiation Facts

 
Carcinogens
Mutagens
Radioactivity
Radiobiology
Radiation health effects
Radiation protection